Mary Nkechi Timms is a Nigerian model and beauty pageant titleholder who was crowned Face of Next Generation Entertainment Awards 2017.

Personal life
Timms is from Nnewi, Anambra State. She is based in the United States.

Pageantry

Face of Next Generation Entertainment Awards 2017
In 2017, Timms was crowned the winner of the 2017 edition of the Face of Next Generation Entertainment Awards 2017 that was held at Upper Marlboro, Maryland, United States.

References

Living people
1981 births
Nigerian beauty pageant winners
Igbo beauty pageant contestants